The Portrait of Pope Leo X with two Cardinals is a painting by the Italian High Renaissance master Raphael, executed c. 1518-1520. It is housed in the Uffizi Gallery of Florence. But currently on exhibition at the Palazzo Pitti.

In contrast to works depicting classical, idealised Madonnas and figures from antiquity, this portrait shows the sitter in a realistic manner. The Pope is depicted with the weight of late middle age, while his sight appears to be strained. The painting sets up a series of visual contradictions between appearance and reality, intended by Raphael to reflect the unrest of a period of turmoil for the papacy. Martin Luther had recently challenged papal authority, listing among other grievances, Leo X's method of selling indulgences to fund work on St Peter's.

The pommel on top of the Pope's chair evokes the symbolic abacus balls of the Medici family, while the illuminated Bible open on the table has been identified as the Hamilton Bible.

The cardinal to the left of the painting is surely identified as Giulio di Giuliano de' Medici (the future Pope Clement VII) while the other cardinal is usually identified as Luigi de' Rossi, who was a maternal cousin to both the other two portrayed.

See also
List of paintings by Raphael

Notes

References

External links

Leo X
1510s paintings
Leo X
Pope Leo X
Paintings by Raphael in the Uffizi